Oscar Peterson Plays Harold Arlen is an album by Canadian jazz pianist Oscar Peterson, released in 1955.

Track listing
 "As Long as I Live"
 "I Gotta Right to Sing the Blues"
 "Come Rain or Come Shine" (Johnny Mercer)
 "Ac-Cent-Tchu-Ate the Positive" (Mercer)
 "Between the Devil and the Deep Blue Sea"
 "I've Got the World on a String"
 "It's Only a Paper Moon" (E. Y. Harburg, Billy Rose)
 "That Old Black Magic" (Mercer)
 "Let's Fall in Love"
 "Stormy Weather"
 "Blues in the Night" (Mercer)
 "Over the Rainbow" (Yip Harburg)

All songs composed by Harold Arlen, with all lyrics by Ted Koehler. Other lyricists indicated.

Personnel
Oscar Peterson – piano
Herb Ellis – guitar
Ray Brown – double bass

References

External links
Jazz Discography entry for Oscar Peterson plays Harold Arlen

1954 albums
Oscar Peterson albums
Albums produced by Norman Granz
Clef Records albums